Mehran Ahmadi (born on 28 February 1974 in Tehran) is an Iranian actor, director and assistant director. At the 31st Fajr Film Festival in 1391, he was nominated for the Crystal Simorgh for Best Actor in a Leading Role for Rooze Roshan.

He started his cinematic activity in the field of acting in 2006 by acting in the film Adam.

Filmography

Film 
2021 – Pinto
2018 – Centipede
2016 – Breath
2014 – Tameshk 
2014 – Totol & Mystery Chest 
2013 – Track 143
2013 – The Bright Day
2012 – Boghz 
2012 – A Respected Family 
2011 – Thirteen 59 
2011 – Alzheimer 
2011 – Absolutely Tame Is a Horse
2011 – The Sound of My Foot 
2010 – Hich 
2009 – Endless Dreams 
2009 – Bist 
2008 – Over There 
2007 – Adam

Web

Television Series 
The Recall | (iFilm, 2011)
Ferris wheel | Charkhe Falak (IRIB TV1, 2016)
Zafarani | Zafarani (IRIB TV2, 2016)
Capital 3 | Paytakht 3 (IRIB TV1, 2014)
Sounds of Rain | Avaye Baran (IRIB TV3, 2013-2014)
Remembrance | Yadavari (IFILM, 2013-2014)
Mehrabad | Mehrabad (IRIB TV5, 2013)
Paytakht (series 2, 2013, and 6, 2020)
The Chef | Ashpazbashi (IRIB TV1, 2009–2010)

References

External links

 
 

1974 births
Living people
People from Tehran
Iranian male actors
Iranian film directors
Male actors from Tehran
Iranian male film actors
Iranian male television actors